Dasypsyllus is a widespread genus of fleas. Some of its members are found in bird nests, including the moorhen flea, D. gallinulae.

Species
Species include:
 Dasypsyllus aemulus (Jordan, 1933)
 Dasypsyllus araucanus (Jordan et Rothschild, 1920)
 Dasypsyllus comatus (Jordan, 1933)
 Dasypsyllus cteniopus (Jordan et Rothschild, 1920)
 Dasypsyllus gallinulae (Dale, 1878)
 Dasypsyllus lasius (Rothschild, 1909)  
 Dasypsyllus plumosissimus (Smit, 1976)   
 Dasypsyllus stejnegeri (Jordan, 1929)

References

Ceratophyllidae
Parasites of birds
Siphonaptera genera
Taxa named by Charles Fuller Baker